Lint may refer to:

 Fibrous coat of thick hairs covering the seeds of the cotton plant
 Lint (material), an accumulation of fluffy fibers that collect on fabric

Places
 Lint, Belgium, a municipality located in Antwerp, Belgium
 Linț, a village in Chețani Commune, Mureș County, Romania

People
 Tim Armstrong (b. 1965), nicknamed Lint, a punk rock musician, known from Operation Ivy, Rancid, and Transplants
 Jacobus Hendricus van Lint (1932–2004), Dutch mathematician

Computing and technology
 Lint (software), a tool to analyze and find problems in source code
 LINT, Line Islands Time, UTC+14:00
 LINT0 and LINT1, LINTX etc. the interrupt lines on x86 microprocessors

Other uses
 Alstom LHB Coradia LINT, light rail vehicle built by Alstom
 Pocket-lint, a UK-based online news and reviews site

See also
 Lind (disambiguation)
 Lindt (disambiguation)
 Linter (disambiguation)
 Lent (disambiguation)
 Toe jam (disambiguation)